Adjacent or adjacency may refer to:
Adjacent (graph theory), two vertices that are the endpoints of an edge in a graph
Adjacent (music), a conjunct step to a note which is next in the scale

See also
Adjacent angles, two angles that share a common ray
Adjacent channel in broadcasting, a channel that is next to another channel
Adjacency matrix, a matrix that represents a graph
Adjacency pairs in pragmatics, paired utterances such as a question and answer
Adjacent side (polygon), a side that shares an angle with another given side
Adjacent side (right triangle), the side (or cathetus) of a right triangle that touches a given non-right angle